Widow by Proxy is a 1919 American silent romantic comedy film produced by Famous Players-Lasky and distributed by Paramount Pictures. It is based on a 1913 Broadway play by Catherine Chisholm Cushing that starred May Irwin. Julia Crawford Ivers provided the scenario and her son James Van Trees was one of the cinematographers. It is not known whether the film currently survives.

Cast
Marguerite Clark as Gloria Grey
Agnes Vernon as Dolores Pennington (credited as Brownie Vernon)
Gertrude Norman as Sophronia Pennington
Gertrude Claire as Angelica Pennington
Nigel Barrie as Lt. Steven Pennington
John Gilbert as Jack Pennington (credited as  Jack Gilbert)
Al W. Filson as Alexander P. Galloway (credited as  A.W. Filson)
Rosita Marstini as Madame Gilligan

References

External links

AllMovie.com
Still from the production (University of Washington, Sayre collection)

1919 films
American silent feature films
Paramount Pictures films
Films directed by Walter Edwards
American black-and-white films
American romantic comedy films
1919 romantic comedy films
1910s American films
Silent romantic comedy films
Silent American comedy films